Bruce Cannon is an American film editor whose credits include 2 Fast 2 Furious, Four Brothers, Higher Learning, E.T. the Extra-Terrestrial, Sunset Strip, Things We Lost in the Fire, Rosewood, Boyz n the Hood, Love Beats Rhymes and Vincent-N-Roxxy.

External links

American film editors
Living people
Year of birth missing (living people)